New Hope Club is a British pop trio formed in 2015, consisting of Reece Bibby, Blake Richardson, and George Smith. Their debut EP, Welcome to the Club, was released through Steady Records/Hollywood Records on 5 May 2017; the band released their self-titled debut album in February 2020, which peaked at number five on the UK Album Charts.

History
George Smith and Blake Richardson formed New Hope Club in October 2015. As a member of the boy band Stereo Kicks, Reece Bibby appeared on the eleventh season of The X Factor in the UK in 2014, finishing fifth. Stereo Kicks broke up in July 2015 after failing to land a record deal; in November 2015, Bibby joined New Hope Club. Bibby, Smith, and Richardson are all originally from Northern England. New Hope Club's first recording was a cover of "Wake Up" by The Vamps in October 2015. In December 2015, The Vamps signed the band to their label Steady Records, a subsidiary of Virgin EMI Records. They were the second band signed to the label, after The Tide.

The band have supported The Vamps on three of their UK/Europe tours (2017, 2018, 2019) and performed a song each night ('Cecilia') on the Wake Up Tour (2016). They also accompanied The Vamps on their 2018 USA tour

New Hope Club's debut 4-song EP Welcome to the Club was released on Hollywood Records via Steady Records on 5 May 2017. The video for "Perfume" was released in January 2017, and the video for "Fixed" was released with their EP. The band spent 10 weeks on the Billboard Next Big Sound chart, peaking at number 5 on 16 September 2017. At the 2017 Teen Choice Awards, they were nominated for Choice Next Big Thing.

The band released the fourth and final music video of their EP, for the song "Water", on 6 October 2017.

A Christmas song called "Whoever He Is" was released along with a video on 1 December 2017.

The band played their first ever headlining shows at the O2 Shepherd's Bush Empire, in London, on the 1st and 2 June 2018. These shows were sold out and supported by acts such as Max & Harvey and RoadTrip.
In early 2018, they released the music video for their single "Start Over Again" and two songs from the “Early Man” movie soundtrack ("Good Day" and "Tiger Feet”). In the summer of the same year, they also released the music video for their song, "Medicine." This was their fastest music video to reach 1 million views on YouTube. In October 2018, they released their second EP Welcome to the Club Pt. 2.

They released the single "Permission" on 1 February 2019, and the single "Love Again" on 3 May 2019.

In June 2022, they released the "Getting Better" and "Girl Who Does Both" multi-track single.

Touring
New Hope Club opened for The Vamps on their 2016 UK tour, and for their tour of the UK and Ireland in the spring of 2017. They regularly performed "Oh Cecilia (Breaking My Heart)" with The Vamps during that tour. They also opened for Tini Stoessel on her 2017 Got Me Started Tour in Germany. They have also opened for Sabrina Carpenter on her North American summer 2017 De-Tour, and opened yet again for The Vamps on their fall 2017 tour in Australia. In August 2017, they performed at Arthur Ashe Kids' Day at Arthur Ashe Stadium in New York City. In the beginning of 2019 they did a special mini tour in Europe, doing shows in Paris, Amsterdam, Antwerp and Cologne. They embarked their first ever world tour, the Love Again Tour last June 8, 2019 in Manila, Philippines at the New Frontier Theater, continuing to Bangkok, Thailand and Seoul, South Korea. In the summer of 2019 they did shows in the US, and the tour visited a few countries in Europe as well. In the autumn of 2019 the tour visited the UK and Ireland. In 2022, they embarked on their Getting Better Tour, beginning on May 29 with acoustic dates in the U.K., and then fully electric dates in the U.S. beginning on July 12. They will also play dates in Europe, Southeast Asia and Latin America.

Members
 Blake Richardson, born on  – lead vocals, guitar, piano.
 George Smith, born on  – vocals, guitar, piano.
 Reece Bibby, born on  – vocals, bass, drum, cajon, guitar. He was a member of the X Factor group, Stereo Kicks.

Discography

Studio albums

Extended plays

Singles

Music videos

References

Musical groups established in 2015
English pop music groups
English boy bands
British musical trios
Hollywood Records artists
2015 establishments in England